The women's big air competition in freestyle skiing at the 2022 Winter Olympics was held on 7 February (qualification) and 8 February (final), at the Big Air Shougang in Beijing. This will be the inaugural freestyle skiing women's big air competition at the Olympics. Eileen Gu, representing China, became the champion, Tess Ledeux of France won the silver medal, and Mathilde Gremaud of Switzerland the bronze medal. For Gu and Ledeux, this was their first Olympic medal.

At the 2021–22 FIS Freestyle Ski World Cup, only two big air events were held before the Olympics. Ledeux won one of them and was second in the other one, and Gu won another event. Anastasia Tatalina was the 2021 world champion. Gremaud was the 2021 X-Games winner.

In the finals, Ledeux won the first run, closely followed by Gu. She continued the lead in the second run, as Gu's run was worse, and Gremaud came up second. However, in the third run Gu had the same score as Ledeux in the first one, and as her first run score was still higher than Ledeux's second run score, she became the champion.

Qualification

A total of 30 athletes qualified to compete at the games. For an athlete to compete they must have a minimum of 50.00 FIS points on the FIS Points List on January 17, 2022, and a top 30 finish in a World Cup event or at the FIS Freestyle Ski World Championships 2021 in either big air or slopestyle. A country could enter a maximum of four athletes into the event.

Results

Qualification
 Q — Qualified for the Final

The top 12 athletes in the qualifiers advanced to the Final.

Final

References

Women's freestyle skiing at the 2022 Winter Olympics